Cryptophasa pultenae is a moth of the family Xyloryctidae. It is known in Australia from New South Wales and Queensland.

Description
The wingspan is about 25 mm for males and about 40 mm for females. The wings are silvery-white, the anterior pair with three small black spots in the middle and a marginal row at the extremity; hinder wings black in the male, white in the female, with a series of angular black marks at the hinder margin: abdomen with a square spot of bright red toward the base.

Biology
The larvae feed on Pultenaea villosa, Acmena smithii, Backhousia myrtifolia, Syzygium australis and the introduced Psidium guava. The larva bores downwards a cylindrical chamber in the centre of the stem of the host plant. The entrance is arched over with a fabric of web and excrement, under which it feeds during the day. Adults are on wing in November, December, January, February and March.

References

Cryptophasa
Moths described in 1805